Margie Ruddick is a New York-based landscape architect. In 2013 she won the National Design Award for landscape architecture. Her projects include designs at Queens Plaza Dutch Kills Green, Urban Garden Room, New York Aquarium Perimeter Project, Shillim Retreat and Institute, Casa Cabo, Baja California, and Bay Garden, Florida.

References

American landscape architects
National Design Award winners